Luce dei miei occhi (internationally released as Light of My Eyes) is a 2001 Italian romance-drama film directed by Giuseppe Piccioni.

The film entered the 58th Venice International Film Festival, where Luigi Lo Cascio and Sandra Ceccarelli were awarded with the Volpi Cup for Best Actor and Best Actress, respectively.

Cast 
Luigi Lo Cascio: Antonio
Sandra Ceccarelli: Maria
Silvio Orlando: Saverio
Barbara Valente: Lisa
Toni Bertorelli: Mario 
Valeria Sabel: Old woman

References

External links

2001 films
Italian drama films
Films scored by Ludovico Einaudi
Films directed by Giuseppe Piccioni
2000s Italian films